The Hay Wain – originally titled Landscape: Noon – is a painting by John Constable, completed in 1821, which depicts a rural scene on the River Stour between the English counties of Suffolk and Essex. It hangs in the National Gallery in London and is regarded as "Constable's most famous image" and one of the greatest and most popular English paintings.

Painted in oils on canvas, the work depicts as its central feature three horses pulling what in fact appears to be a wood wain or large farm wagon across the river. Willy Lott's Cottage, also the subject of an eponymous painting by Constable, is visible on the far-left. The scene takes place near Flatford Mill in Suffolk, though since the Stour forms the border of two counties, the left bank is in Suffolk and the landscape on the right bank is in Essex.

The Hay Wain is one of a series of paintings by Constable called the "six-footers", large-scale canvasses which he painted for the annual summer exhibitions at the Royal Academy. As with all of the paintings in this series, Constable produced a full-scale oil sketch for the work; this is now in the Victoria and Albert Museum in London. Constable originally exhibited the finished work with the title Landscape: Noon, suggesting that he envisaged it as belonging to the classical landscape tradition of representing the cycles of nature.

The painting measures .

History
Flatford Mill was owned by Constable's father. The house on the left side of the painting belonged to a neighbour, Willy Lott, a tenant farmer, who was said to have been born in the house and never to have left it for more than four days in his lifetime. Willy Lott's Cottage still survives practically unaltered, but none of the trees in the painting exist today.

Although The Hay Wain is revered today as one of the greatest British paintings, when it was originally exhibited at the Royal Academy in 1821 (under the title Landscape: Noon), it failed to find a buyer.

It was considerably better received in France where it was praised by Théodore Géricault. The painting caused a sensation when it was exhibited with other works by Constable at the 1824 Paris Salon (it has been suggested that the inclusion of Constable's paintings in the exhibition was a tribute to Géricault, who died early that year). In that exhibition, The Hay Wain was singled out for a gold medal awarded by Charles X of France, a cast of which is incorporated into the picture's frame. The works by Constable in the exhibition inspired a new generation of French painters, including Eugène Delacroix.

Sold at the exhibition with three other Constables to the dealer John Arrowsmith, The Hay Wain was brought back to England by another dealer, D. T. White; he sold it to a Mr. Young who resided in Ryde on the Isle of Wight. It was there that the painting came to the attention of the collector Henry Vaughan and the painter Charles Robert Leslie. On the death of his friend Mr. Young, Vaughan bought the painting from the former's estate; in 1886, he presented it to the National Gallery in London, where it still hangs today. In his will, Vaughan bequeathed the full-scale oil sketch for The Hay Wain, made with a palette knife, to the South Kensington Museum (now the Victoria and Albert Museum).The Hay Wain was voted the second most popular painting in any British gallery, second only to Turner's Fighting Temeraire, in a 2005 poll organised by BBC Radio 4's Today programme.

It has been suggested that the reason for the wagon stopping at the ford was to allow the river water to cool the horses' legs and to soak the wheels. In hot dry weather, the wooden wheels would shrink away from their metal rims. Wetting the wheels reduced the shrinkage and kept the outer metal band in place.

On 28 June 2013, a protester, reported to be connected with Fathers 4 Justice, glued a photograph of a young boy to the painting while it was on display at the National Gallery. The work was not permanently damaged. On 4 July 2022, two Just Stop Oil protestors attached their own modified "apocalyptic vision of the future" version of the painting to the original and glued themselves to the frame. The National Gallery said the surface varnish of the painting and its frame suffered minor damage.

References

External links

 National Gallery information
 
Constable's England, the full text of an exhibition catalogue from the Metropolitan Museum of Art, which contains material on The Hay Wain

Collections of the National Gallery, London
1821 paintings
Paintings by John Constable
Dogs in art
Horses in art
Water in art
Vandalized works of art in the United Kingdom
England in art